SS Aquarama was built as Marine Star, one of five breakbulk cargo ships of the United States Maritime Commission (USMC) type C4-S-B5 having that C4 design variant. From September 1947 the ship was laid up except for brief periods in the James River.

In 1952 the ship was converted into the largest passenger ship ever to operate in the Great Lakes.

Ship History

Marine Star 
Marine Star was built by Sun Shipbuilding & Drydock Co., Chester, Pennsylvania as one of five United States Maritime Commission (USMC) type C4-S-B5 breakbulk cargo ships, yard hull number 357, USMC hull number 752. The ship's keel was laid 18 October 1944, launched on 30 April 1945 and delivery to the War Shipping Administration (WSA) on 28 July 1945.

The American Hawaiian Steamship Company operated Marine Star for WSA under a General Agency Agreement for the remainder of the war and until 9 August 1946. The ship was then operated for short periods by other agents under various agreements including bareboat charter until the ship was placed in the James River Reserve Fleet on 15 September 1947. Except for a charter by Seas Shipping Company 12 May 1948 to 14 June 1949 the ship remained inactive until sold 29 June 1951 to Wisconsin & Michigan Steamship Company. Though sold, the ship remained in the James fleet until removed by the buyer in December 1952.

Aquarama 
Wisconsin & Michigan Steamship Co., a subsidiary of Sand Products Company of Detroit, had Marine Star taken to Todd Shipyards at Brooklyn, New York, where her old superstructure was cut down. In September 1953, the ship was towed to Muskegon, Michigan where it was converted into a commercial passenger ship by Steel Fabricating of Muskegon. The entire process took approximately two years to complete and cost nearly $8 million. The president of the Sand Products Corporation at the time, Max McKee, wanted the Aquarama to be an ocean liner for the Great Lakes. In 1955, ownership of the vessel was transferred to Michigan-Ohio Navigation Company, another subsidiary of Sand Products Corporation.

Aquarama began operation in 1956 by touring various Great Lakes ports. In 1957 the Michigan-Ohio Navigation Company, began service from Detroit to Cleveland, carrying automobiles and passengers. Once in service, the ship was able to transport its passengers and their automobiles from Detroit to Cleveland in under six hours.

Although the ship was immensely popular, it never generated enough revenue to be self-supporting; On September 4, 1962 the ship made its last trip, laying up at the Mart Dock in Muskegon, Michigan. Operating the ship from Muskegon, Michigan to Milwaukee as a replacement for the older Milwaukee Clipper was proposed, but $700,000 for dredging so the Aquarama could be accommodated in Milwaukee harbor was needed. As a result, the ship sat idle until 1987 when it was sold to the North Shore Farming Company for around $3 million.

Aquarama was briefly docked at Sarnia, then Windsor before returning to its original name of Marine Star in 1995 and moving under tow to Buffalo. On August 3, 1995 the Marine Star was berthed at the Cargill Pool Elevator where it stayed until it was towed overseas to Aliağa, Turkey for scrap in September 2007.

Capacity and Safety 
As a cruise liner, Aquarama was able to carry 2,500 passengers and 160 automobiles. Some of the ship's safety features included its all-steel construction, the smoke detection system, four 135-passenger lifeboats, the latest in radar, and closed circuit television for viewing the stern.

Entertainment 
On the ship there were numerous sources of entertainment for the passengers. Among many other things there was a "carnival room" that had a gift shop, games, and a photo booth. Two television theaters were available to be used for conferences or special programs. Along with the theaters, the ship contained two dance floors that were accompanied by a stage for an orchestra, or other performances. For those traveling with their families, there were even baby-sitting services available. People had the choice of four different types of restaurants that varied in style and price. Along with the restaurants, there was a main cafeteria that was able to fit nearly 300 people.

See also 
 SS Canadiana
 Type C4-class ship
Aquastar (ship)

References

External links 
 Outboard Profiles of Maritime Commission Vessels — The C4 and his Sub Designs and Conversions (bottom, profile of Aquarama)
 Images of the Aquarama being scrapped

1945 ships
Type C4-S-B ships
Ships built in Chester, Pennsylvania
Ships built by the Sun Shipbuilding & Drydock Company
Merchant ships of the United States
Passenger ships of the Great Lakes
Ferries of Michigan